Harvey Edward Kuenn (December 4, 1930 – February 28, 1988) was an American professional baseball player, coach, and manager in Major League Baseball (MLB). As a shortstop and outfielder, he played with the Detroit Tigers (1952–1959), Cleveland Indians (1960), San Francisco Giants (1961–1965), Chicago Cubs (1965–1966), and Philadelphia Phillies (1966). Kuenn batted and threw right-handed. After retiring, he managed the Milwaukee Brewers (1975, 1982–1983).

Early life and career
Kuenn was born in West Allis, Wisconsin, but raised in neighboring Milwaukee and attended Lutheran High School. He was the only child born to German-Americans Harvey and Dorothy (Wrensch) Kuenn. He once kicked (dropkicked) a 53-yard field goal for Lutheran in a football game, which is tied for the eighth-longest field goal in Wisconsin high school football history. He played collegiate baseball at the University of Wisconsin–Madison, where he was a member of Delta Upsilon fraternity. Signed by Detroit as an amateur free agent in 1952, Kuenn was named the starting shortstop after joining the team late in the season. In his first full season in 1953, he hit .308 with 94 runs and led the major leagues with 209 hits, setting a major league rookie record with 167 singles. He received the American League Rookie of the Year and TSN Rookie of the Year awards. Also in that season, he received the first of his ten consecutive selections to the All-Star Game. On October 29, 1955, he married former Miss Wisconsin 1954, Dixie Ann Sarchet in her hometown of Stevens Point, Wisconsin.

A line drive hitter who hit to all fields, Kuenn showed consistency in the next two seasons, compiling very similar numbers: he hit .306 with 81 runs and 201 hits in 1954, then hit .306 with 101 runs and 190 hits in 1955. In 1956, he set career highs with 12 home runs and 88 RBIs and raised his average to .332, surpassed only by Mickey Mantle (.353) and Ted Williams (.345) in the batting race. A year later, he slumped badly to .277. But he rebounded in 1958 with .319, ending third in the league behind Williams (.328) and Pete Runnels (.322), and surpassing Al Kaline, Vic Power, Bob Cerv, Mantle, Rocky Colavito, Minnie Miñoso and Nellie Fox. In that season, he switched to the outfield, where he played all three positions over the remainder of his career.

Later playing career
After winning the American League batting crown in 1959 with a .353 average, Kuenn was traded to Cleveland for Rocky Colavito, who had won the home run title with 42 homers (the trade that is often referred to by Cleveland fans as "the curse of Rocky Colavito"). With the Indians, Kuenn hit .308 in the 1960 season. He finished his career in the National League playing for the Giants, Cubs and Phillies, retiring at the end of the 1966 season.

In a 15-season playing career, Kuenn was a .303 hitter with 87 home runs and 671 RBI in 1833 games. He led the AL in hits four times and doubles three times, and finished with 2,092 hits. Playing all three outfield positions and the infield except catcher and second base, Kuenn recorded a .966 fielding percentage.

Kuenn had the dubious distinction of making the final out in two of Sandy Koufax's four no-hitters—in 1963 and 1965. In the former, the final out was on a ground ball back to Koufax. In the latter, he struck out for the final out in Koufax's perfect game.

Kuenn was activated by the Brewers for the last two weeks of 1970, in order for him to qualify for a pension. He never appeared in a game, however.

Milwaukee Brewers career
Kuenn became a Milwaukee Brewers coach in 1972 and served as an interim manager in 1975. He suffered a series of medical complications beginning in the mid-1970s, including heart and stomach surgeries, and in February 1980, he had his right leg amputated just below the knee after a blood clot cut circulation. He returned to coaching only six months after the operation.

In 1982, Kuenn managed the Milwaukee Brewers to their only World Series appearance to date after taking over the team in mid-season. He was selected by the Associated Press as the AL Manager of the Year, after taking the Brewers in June from a 23-24 start to the AL East title with a 95-67 record. Milwaukee then won the AL pennant after rallying from a 2-0 deficit and beating the California Angels in the best-of-five American League Championship Series. They ultimately lost the 1982 World Series to the St. Louis Cardinals in seven games.

During his tenure, the hard-hitting Brewers were known as "Harvey's Wallbangers". At the time, the Brewers' roster included Cecil Cooper, Ben Oglivie, Gorman Thomas, and future Hall of Famers Paul Molitor, Ted Simmons and Robin Yount.

Kuenn was fired as manager after the Brewers finished fifth in the AL East with an otherwise respectable 87-75 record in 1983. He compiled a 160-118 managerial record. 

After being replaced, Kuenn worked as a major league scouting consultant for the Brewers.

Death
Kuenn died from complications from heart disease and diabetes at his home in Peoria, Arizona, in 1988 at the age of 57. The Brewers wore a patch with his initials during the 1988 season to commemorate him. That same year, he was elected to the Wisconsin Athletic Hall of Fame. In 2002, his name was added to the Brewers' honorarium with a plaque in the concourse circling American Family Field.

See also
 List of Major League Baseball career hits leaders
 List of Major League Baseball batting champions
 List of Major League Baseball annual doubles leaders
 Major League Baseball titles leaders

References

External links

Harvey Kuenn at Baseball Almanac

All-American college baseball players
Major League Baseball shortstops
Major League Baseball outfielders
Chicago Cubs players
Cleveland Indians players
Detroit Tigers players
Philadelphia Phillies players
San Francisco Giants players
American League All-Stars
American amputees
Baseball players from Milwaukee
American people of German descent
American League batting champions
Major League Baseball first base coaches
Major League Baseball hitting coaches
Major League Baseball Rookie of the Year Award winners
Milwaukee Brewers coaches
Milwaukee Brewers managers
Wisconsin Badgers baseball players
American Lutherans
People from West Allis, Wisconsin
1930 births
1988 deaths
People from Peoria, Arizona
20th-century Lutherans
Davenport Tigers players